The Delaware is a breed of chicken originating in the U.S. state of Delaware. It was once of relative importance to the U.S. chicken industry, but today is critically endangered. It is primarily suited to meat production but also lays reasonably well. It has plumage of a unique pattern, and is accepted into poultry standards for showing.

Characteristics
With males weighing 8.5 pounds (3.9 kilos) and hens 6.5 pounds (3 kilos), the Delaware is a medium-sized breed. They have rather large, bright red colored single combs and wattles. Delawares appear in a single color type: a white body and breast, with light black barring on the ends of the hackle, wings and tails. It is similar to the Columbian color seen in some breeds, but has barring in the dark portions, rather than uniform black. Also of note is that all feathers have a white quill and shaft, which, combined with yellow skin, makes for a cleaner appearing carcass. Like most standard breeds of chicken, the Delaware has a miniaturized bantam version; however, these are rarely seen.

Delawares are hardy birds that mature quickly. Hens are good layers of large to jumbo brown eggs and will go broody. Unlike the most common commercial meat birds in use today, the Delaware does well in free range operations. In temperament, it is a calm, but not a typically friendly bird although in some cases can be.

Approximate weight

History
In the early 20th century, crosses of Barred Plymouth Rock roosters on New Hampshire hens was a common choice for producing broilers. Occasionally, this mating produces sports with light coloration. By breeding these white (genetically silver) sports intentionally, George Ellis of Delaware created the breed in 1940. He first chose to call them Indian Rivers, but later the name was switched to match its state of origin. At the time, the Delmarva Peninsula, where the breed was created, supplied chicken to the entirety of the East Coast of the United States through companies such as Perdue Farms. The Delaware rapidly became the premiere broiler fowl in use in the region, thus affecting the industry at large. In 1952, it was recognized for exhibition by acceptance into the American Poultry Association's Standard of Perfection.

Beginning in the mid-1950s, commercial farms began to use the White Cornish-Rock cross that would come to dominate the chicken industry into the next century. The speedy adoption of the Cornish-Rock saw the decline of the Delaware, though it persisted in some areas into the 1960s. In the 21st century, the Delaware is considered a critically endangered breed by organizations such as the American Livestock Breeds Conservancy. It is also included in Slow Food USA's Ark of Taste, a list of heritage foods.

Footnotes

References

External links

 Delaware Club of America
Delawares at mypetchicken
 Official Delaware Poultry Club

Conservation Priority Breeds of the Livestock Conservancy
Chicken breeds originating in the United States
Chicken breeds